Vet School Confidential is a reality TV show that first aired on Animal Planet in 2001. It follows five students from the Michigan State University College of Veterinary Medicine as they go through their clinical rotations tending to a variety of animals.  Examples of the topics in episodes include; students doing physical exams of cows, performing open-heart surgery on a puppy, or dehorning a goat.

References

.

External links
Episode listing at TV Guide.com

Veterinary reality television series
2000s American reality television series
2010s American reality television series
2020s American reality television series
2001 American television series debuts
Animal Planet original programming
Television shows set in Michigan
Michigan State University